Li Chi may refer to:

Chi Li (born 1957), Chinese writer 
Li Chi (footballer) (born 1983), Chinese association footballer

See also
Li Ji (disambiguation), pinyin equivalent of "Li Chi" in Wade–Giles romanization